ObjectRocket is a cloud database (DBaaS) company based in Austin, Texas, specializing in NoSQL datastores including MongoDB, Elasticsearch, Redis. ObjectRocket has "designed and managed systems that power some of the busiest sites on the web, and played key founding development roles at companies like Shutterfly, PayPal, eBay and AOL." In 2013, they were acquired by Rackspace.

References

External links 
 

Companies based in Austin, Texas